Vislanka is a village and municipality in Stará Ľubovňa District in the Prešov Region of northern Slovakia.

History
In historical records the village was first mentioned in 1773.

Geography
The municipality lies at an altitude of 541 metres and covers an area of 4.233 km². It has a population of about 282 people.

External links
Vislanka - The Carpathian Connection
https://web.archive.org/web/20071027094149/http://www.statistics.sk/mosmis/eng/run.html

Villages and municipalities in Stará Ľubovňa District
Šariš